Calamidia is a genus of tiger moths in the family Erebidae.

Species
 Calamidia hirta Walker, 1854
 Syn. Calamidia salpinctis

Former species
 Calamidia castanea Rothschild, 1912
 Calamidia goliathina
 Calamidia owgarra Bethune-Baker, 1908
 Calamidia reticulata
 Calamidia warringtonella Bethune-Baker, 1908

References

External links
Natural History Museum Lepidoptera generic names catalog

Lithosiina
Moth genera